Kasba is a satellite town of Purnia city and part of Purnia Urban Agglomeration in Purnia district in the Indian state of Mithila region of Bihar.

Demographics
 India census, Kasba had a population of 25,522. Males constitute 53% of the population and females 47%. Kasba has an average literacy rate of 49%, lower than the national average of 59.5%: male literacy is 57%, and female literacy is 41%. In Kasba, 18% of the population is under 6 years of age.

Geographical location

Situated in the North Eastern part of Bihar, Kasba lies between 87.5' Eastern Longitude and 25.8 Degree North Latitude. Covers 0.5% (30 km2) of the state's area. Kasba can be broadly divided into two physiographic units, the Plains and the Plateau. A land endowed with minerals, fertile green fields, peace fallboard force, vast market and a political system committed to industrial growth.

Transportation

Road
 passes through Kasba. This National Highway connects Kasba to Purnia, Siliguri, Guwahati, Kolkata, Muzaffarpur, Patna, Gorakhpur, Lucknow and Porbandar.

Another, State Highway starts from Kasba that direct connects it to Line Bazar(Medical hub of this region), Purnia Court railway station and Kosi Division.

Railways
Kasba railway station lies on Barauni-Katihar, Saharsa and Purnia sections. Two Express trains pass through Kasba but don't stop here, only DEMU stops here.

References

External links
 http://kasba-purnia.com/

Cities and towns in Purnia district